The Maronne is a  long river in the Cantal and Corrèze departments in south central France. Its source is several small streams joining near Récusset, a hamlet in Saint-Paul-de-Salers. It flows generally west. It is a left tributary of the Dordogne, into which it flows between Argentat and Monceaux-sur-Dordogne.

Departments and communes along its course
This list is ordered from source to mouth:

Cantal: Saint-Paul-de-Salers, Fontanges, Saint-Martin-Valmeroux, Sainte-Eulalie, Besse, Pleaux, Saint-Martin-Cantalès, Arnac,
Corrèze: Saint-Julien-aux-Bois
Cantal: Cros-de-Montvert,
Corrèze: Saint-Cirgues-la-Loutre,
Cantal: Rouffiac,
Corrèze: Saint-Geniez-ô-Merle, Goulles, Saint-Bonnet-les-Tours-de-Merle, Sexcles, Hautefage, Mercœur, La Chapelle-Saint-Géraud, Argentat and Monceaux-sur-Dordogne

References

Rivers of France
Rivers of Auvergne-Rhône-Alpes
Rivers of Nouvelle-Aquitaine
Rivers of Cantal
Rivers of Corrèze